Pimeliini is a tribe of darkling beetles in the subfamily Pimeliinae of the family Tenebrionidae. There are more than 60 genera in Pimeliini, found primarily in the Palearctic.

Genera
These genera belong to the tribe Pimeliini

 Afghanopachys Kwieton, 1978  (the Palearctic)
 Allotadzhikistania Bogatchev, 1960  (the Palearctic)
 Apatopsis Semenov, 1891  (the Palearctic)
 Argyradelpha G.S. Medvedev, 2005  (the Palearctic)
 Argyrophana Semenov, 1889  (the Palearctic)
 Astorthocnemis Lillig & Pavlícek, 2002  (the Palearctic)
 Balachowskya Peyerimhoff, 1928  (the Palearctic)
 Bogatshevia G.S. Medvedev & Iwan, 2006  (the Palearctic)
 Cyclocnera Leo, 2018  (the Palearctic)
 Diesia Fischer von Waldheim, 1820  (the Palearctic)
 Dietomorpha Reymond, 1938  (the Palearctic)
 Earophanta Semenov, 1903  (the Palearctic)
 Euryostola Reitter, 1893  (the Palearctic)
 Euthriptera Reitter, 1893  (the Palearctic)
 Gedeon Reiche & Saulcy, 1857  (the Palearctic)
 Habrobates Semenov, 1903  (the Palearctic)
 Habrochiton Semenov, 1907  (the Palearctic)
 Homopsis Semenov, 1893  (the Palearctic)
 Idiesa Reitter, 1893  (the Palearctic)
 Iranolasiostola Pierre, 1968  (the Palearctic)
 Iranopachyscelis Pierre, 1968  (the Palearctic)
 Kawiria Schuster, 1935  (the Palearctic)
 Lasiostola Dejean, 1834  (the Palearctic)
 Leucolaephus P.H. Lucas, 1859  (the Palearctic)
 Mantichorula Reitter, 1889  (the Palearctic)
 Meladiesia Reitter, 1909  (the Palearctic)
 Ocnera Fischer von Waldheim, 1822  (the Palearctic)
 Pachylodera Quedenfeldt, 1890  (the Palearctic)
 Pachyscelina Kwieton, 1978  (the Palearctic)
 Pachyscelis Solier, 1836  (the Palearctic)
 Paraplatyope Löbl, Bouchard, Merkl & Bousquet, 2020  (the Palearctic)
 Pelorocnemis Solsky, 1876  (the Palearctic)
 Phymatiotris Solier, 1836  (the Palearctic)
 Pimelia Fabricius, 1775  (the Palearctic, tropical Africa, and Indomalaya)
 Pimeliocnera Reitter, 1909  (the Palearctic)
 Pimelipachys Skopin, 1962  (the Palearctic)
 Pisterotarsa Motschulsky, 1860  (the Palearctic)
 Platyesia Skopin, 1971  (the Palearctic)
 Platyope Fischer von Waldheim, 1820  (the Palearctic)
 Podhomala Solier, 1836  (the Palearctic)
 Polpogenia Solier, 1836  (tropical Africa)
 Prionotheca Dejean, 1834  (the Palearctic and tropical Africa)
 Przewalskia Semenov, 1893  (the Palearctic)
 Pseudopachyscelis Skopin, 1968  (the Palearctic)
 Pseudoplatyope Pierre, 1964  (the Palearctic)
 Pseudopodhomala Schuster, 1938  (the Palearctic)
 Pseudostorthocnemis Gridelli, 1952  (the Palearctic)
 Pterocoma Dejean, 1834  (the Palearctic)
 Pterolasia Solier, 1836  (the Palearctic and tropical Africa)
 Scelace Marseul, 1887  (the Palearctic)
 Spectrocnera Kwieton, 1981  (tropical Africa)
 Stalagmoptera Solsky, 1876  (the Palearctic)
 Sternocnera Skopin, 1964  (the Palearctic)
 Sternodes Fischer von Waldheim, 1837  (the Palearctic)
 Sternoplax Frivaldszky, 1890  (the Palearctic)
 Sternotrigon Skopin, 1973  (the Palearctic)
 Storthocnemis Karsch, 1881  (the Palearctic and tropical Africa)
 Tadzhikistania Bogatchev, 1960  (the Palearctic)
 Thriptera Solier, 1836  (the Palearctic and tropical Africa)
 Trachyderma Latreille, 1828  (the Palearctic, tropical Africa, and Australasia)
 Trigonocnera Reitter, 1893  (the Palearctic)
 Trigonopachys Skopin, 1968  (the Palearctic)
 Trigonoscelis Dejean, 1834  (the Palearctic)
 Waterhousia Skopin, 1973  (the Palearctic)

References

Further reading

 
 

Tenebrionoidea